Giuseppe Bognanni (born 18 July 1947) is a retired Italian flyweight wrestler who won a bronze medal at the 1972 Summer Olympics in Greco-Roman wrestling. At the European championships he finished third in 1969 and fourth in 1972 in Greco-Roman wrestling, and sixth in 1974 in freestyle wrestling.

References

External links
 

1947 births
Living people
People from Riesi
Olympic wrestlers of Italy
Wrestlers at the 1972 Summer Olympics
Wrestlers at the 1976 Summer Olympics
Italian male sport wrestlers
Olympic bronze medalists for Italy
Olympic medalists in wrestling
Medalists at the 1972 Summer Olympics
Sportspeople from the Province of Caltanissetta
20th-century Italian people
21st-century Italian people